Margaret Dudley is the name of:

Makarena Dudley, also known as Margaret Dudley, New Zealand clinical psychologist and dementia researcher
Margaret Howard, Duchess of Norfolk (1540–1564), second wife of Thomas Howard, 4th Duke of Norfolk
Rita Childers (1915–2010), second wife of Erskine Hamilton Childers, fourth President of Ireland